Lucie-Anne Blazek (born 28 April 1984 in Sorengo, Switzerland) is a Swiss figure skater. She is the 2000 Swiss junior national champion and the 2004 Swiss national silver medalist. She competed for three seasons on the Junior Grand Prix series and once at the World Junior Figure Skating Championships.

External links
 

Swiss female single skaters
1984 births
Living people
Sportspeople from Ticino